Rajnagar  is a village in the Gobindpur CD block in the Seraikela Sadar subdivision of the Seraikela Kharsawan district in the Indian state of Jharkhand.

Geography

Location

Area overview
The area shown in the map has been described as “part of the southern fringe of the Chotanagpur plateau and is a hilly upland tract”. 75.7% of the population lives in the rural areas and 24.3% lives in the urban areas.

Note: The map alongside presents some of the notable locations in the district. All places marked in the map are linked in the larger full screen map.

Civic administration
There is a police station at Rajnagar.

The headquarters of Gobindpur CD block are located at Rajnagar village.

Demographics
According to the 2011 Census of India, Rajnagar had a total population of 1,806, of which 900 (50%) were males and 906 (50%) were females. Population in the age range 0–6 years was 222. The total number of literate persons in Rajnagar was 1,106 (69.82% of the population over 6 years).

(*For language details see Gobindpur block#Language and religion)

Education
Government S.S.High School, Rajnagar, is a Hindi-medium coeducational institution established in 1959. It has facilities for teaching from class IX to class XII. The school has a playground and a library with 212 books.

Kasturba Gandhi Balika Vidyalaya is a Hindi-medium girls only institution established in 2006. It has facilities for teaching in classes VI and XII. The school has a playground, a library with 72 books and has 5 computers for teaching and learning purposes.

Academic English High School is an English-medium coeducational institution established in 1997. It has facilities for teaching from class I to class XII. The school has a playground, a library with 500 books and has 10 computers for teaching and learning purposes.

References

Villages in Seraikela Kharsawan district